Tenellus is a genus of thorny catfishes native to tropical South America.

Species
There are currently 3 recognized species in this genus:
 Tenellus leporhinus (C. H. Eigenmann, 1912) 
 Tenellus ternetzi (C. H. Eigenmann, 1925) 
 Tenellus trimaculatus (Boulenger, 1898)

References

Doradidae
Fish of South America
Catfish genera
Freshwater fish genera